The 1969 Curaçao Tennis Championships was a combined men's and women's professional tennis tournament played on outdoor hard courts at the Curaçao Sport Club in Willemstad, Curaçao, Dutch West Indies. It was the 4th edition of the tournament, the second edition of the Open Era, and was held from 24 February through 2 March 1969. Cliff Richey and Julie Heldman won the singles titles.

Champions

Men's singles

 Cliff Richey defeated  Mark Cox 6–4, 6–3, 6–3

Women's singles

 Julie Heldman defeated  Nancy Richey 5–7, 6–1, 10–8

Men's doubles

 Manuel Orantes /  Ray Ruffels defeated  Ove Bengtson /  Mark Cox 6–4, 6–3

Women's doubles

 Margaret Court /  Judy Tegart defeated  Julie Heldman /  Nancy Richey 6–4, 6–2

References

Curacao Tennis Championships
1969 in Dutch tennis